
Gmina Michałowo is an urban-rural gmina (administrative district) in Białystok County, Podlaskie Voivodeship, in north-eastern Poland, on the border with Belarus. (Michałowo gained town status on 1 January 2009 – prior to that the district was classed as a rural gmina.)

The gmina contains part of the protected area called Knyszyń Forest Landscape Park.

Villages
Apart from the town of Michałowo, the gmina contains the villages and settlements of Bachury, Bagniuki, Barszczewo, Bieńdziuga, Bołtryki, Bondary, Borsukowizna, Brzezina, Budy, Cisówka, Ciwoniuki, Dublany, Garbary, Gonczary, Gorbacze, Hieronimowo, Hoźna, Jałówka, Julianka, Juszkowy Gród, Kalitnik, Kamienny Bród, Kazimierowo, Kituryki, Kobylanka, Kokotowo, Kokotowo-Leśniczówka, Koleśne, Kondratki, Kopce, Kowalowy Gród, Krugły Lasek, Krukowszczyzna, Krynica, Kuchmy-Kuce, Kuchmy-Pietruki, Kuryły, Leonowicze, Lewsze, Maciejkowa Góra, Majdan, Marynka, Michałowo-Kolonia, Mościska, Mostowlany-Kolonia, Nowa Łuplanka, Nowa Wola, Nowe Kuchmy, Nowosady, Odnoga-Kuźmy, Osiedle Bondary, Oziabły, Pieńki, Pieńki-Kolonia, Planty, Pólko, Potoka, Rochental, Romanowo, Rudnia, Rybaki, Sacharki, Sokole, Stanek, Stara Łuplanka, Stare Kuchmy, Supruny, Suszcza, Świnobród, Szymki, Tanica Dolna, Tanica Górna, Tokarowszczyzna, Topolany, Tylwica, Tylwica-Kolonia, Tylwica-Majątek, Wierch-Topolany, Zajma, Zaleszany and Żednia.

Neighbouring gminas
Gmina Michałowo is bordered by the gminas of Gródek, Narew, Narewka and Zabłudów. It also borders Belarus.

References
 Polish official population figures 2006

Michalowo
Białystok County